Maria Marietta Rizzotti (born 8 November 1953) is an Italian Senator from Forza Italia. She represents Piedmont.

See also 

 List of current Italian senators

References 

Living people
Senators of Legislature XVI of Italy
Senators of Legislature XVII of Italy
Senators of Legislature XVIII of Italy
21st-century Italian women politicians
Politicians from Florence
Politicians of Piedmont
Forza Italia (2013) senators
1953 births
20th-century Italian women
Women members of the Senate of the Republic (Italy)